Members of the New South Wales Legislative Assembly  who served in the 23rd parliament of New South Wales held their seats from 1913 to 1917. They were elected at the 1913 state election on 6 December 1913. The Speaker was Richard Meagher.

See also
First Holman ministry
Second Holman ministry
Results of the 1913 New South Wales state election
Candidates of the 1913 New South Wales state election

References

Members of New South Wales parliaments by term
20th-century Australian politicians